Novak Djokovic defeated Stefanos Tsitsipas in the final, 6–3, 6–4 to win the men's singles tennis title at the 2019 Madrid Open. With the win, Djokovic tied Rafael Nadal's record of 33 Masters 1000 singles titles. He did not lose a single set in the entire tournament.

Alexander Zverev was the defending champion, but lost in the quarterfinals to Tsitsipas.

This tournament marked the last professional appearance of David Ferrer; he lost in the second round to Zverev. It was also Roger Federer's first clay court tournament since the 2016 Rome Masters.

Seeds
The top eight seeds received a bye into the second round.

Draw

Finals

Top half

Section 1

Section 2

Bottom half

Section 3

Section 4

Qualifying

Seeds

Qualifiers

Lucky loser
  Adrian Mannarino

Qualifying draw

First qualifier

Second qualifier

Third qualifier

Fourth qualifier

Fifth qualifier

Sixth qualifier

Seventh qualifier

References

External Links
 Main Draw
 Qualifying Draw

Men's Singles